Homalospermum is a genus of plants in the myrtle family first described as a genus in 1843. It contains only one known species, Homalospermum firmum, endemic to southwestern Western Australia.

References

Myrtaceae
Monotypic Myrtaceae genera
Myrtales of Australia
Endemic flora of Southwest Australia